Chen Huancheng (1776–1842) was a 19th-century military leader of Qing China. He served as the provincial military leader in Jiangnan Province before being killed in the First Opium War.

Biography 
Chen joined the Imperial Army at a young age, in which he served as a standard bearer. Unlike some of his contemporaries, he rose from the ranks of the army to a command position without taking the customary Wu Keju Imperial Examinations. His early promotions were due to his success in suppressing piracy.

In 1830 Chen was promoted to Admiral of Fujian Province by the Daoguang Emperor. During this time he was stationed in Xiamen. He was promoted again in 1840 when he became a Jiangnan Admiral, the highest rank in the Imperial Navy.

During the First Opium War Chen commanded the Chinese defenses at the mouth of the Yangtze River. He swore to defend the waterway and began to fortify his position against British incursions. On 16 June 1842 a British fleet sailed up the Yangtze and began to bombard Huacheng's position at Wusong. While commanding the Chinese fort there, Chen was killed by either naval artillery or in hand-to-hand combat with the British.

Legacy 
Chen was declared a national hero after his death. A tomb and museum are erected in his honor in Shanghai.

References 

1776 births
1842 deaths
People of the First Opium War
Qing military personnel killed in action
Qing dynasty admirals
Deified Chinese people